Richard Talbot (1772 – 29 January 1853), was a soldier and subsequently a promoter of immigration. He was from County Tipperary in Ireland.

He left Ireland with 230 potential settlers in June 1818. Because many people deserted his leadership, he eventually brought only about 75 settlers to newly opened London township in Upper Canada.

Although the settlement itself was a success, Talbot himself did not prosper in the ways he expected. His two eldest sons, Edward Allen Talbot and John Talbot left the area to seek other opportunities.

Talbot resided in London Township, Upper Canada until his death.

External links
 Biography at the Dictionary of Canadian Biography Online

1772 births
1853 deaths
Settlers of Canada
People from County Tipperary